Lycée des Îles Wallis et Futuna (LdIWF), also known as  de Wallis et Futuna is the public senior high school/sixth-form college of the Wallis and Futuna islands. Its campus is on Wallis.

LdIWF offers classes in French, English, Applied Arts, First Aid, Physical Sciences, Economics and Social Sciences. 

Students can also undertake vocational baccalaureates in:
Electrical Engineering
Commerce, Accounting and Administration
Business and Sales
Science and Technology in Management and Administration

References

External links
 Lycée des Îles Wallis et Futuna 

Wallis and Futuna
Schools in France